Dobrava is a settlement on the left bank of the Drava River in the Municipality of Radlje ob Dravi in Slovenia.

See also 
Dobrava (toponym)

References

External links
Dobrava on Geopedia

Populated places in the Municipality of Radlje ob Dravi